Nina Soldano (born 26 March 1963) is an Italian actress.

Life and career 
Born in Pisa to Apulian parents, Soldano made her debut in the 1987 Renzo Arbore's variety show Indietro tutta, in which she played the role of Miss Sud,  and went on to appear in films, such as Night of the Sharks (1988), Delitti e profumi (1988), Paprika (1991), Fatalità (1992) and Fatal Frames (1996). Also active on stage, Soldano is better known for her roles in several TV-series, notably the Rai 3 soap-opera Un posto al sole, in which she played the character of Marina Giordano since 2003.

References

External links 
 
 

Italian film actresses
Italian television actresses
Italian stage actresses
1963 births
People from Pisa
Living people
Italian television personalities